Stéphanie Mariage (born 3 April 1966) is a retired French para table tennis player who is a double Paralympic champion and a five time European champion in both singles and team events.

References

1966 births
Living people
People from Arles
French female table tennis players
Paralympic table tennis players of France
Table tennis players at the 2000 Summer Paralympics
Table tennis players at the 2004 Summer Paralympics
Table tennis players at the 2008 Summer Paralympics
Medalists at the 2000 Summer Paralympics
Medalists at the 2004 Summer Paralympics
Medalists at the 2008 Summer Paralympics
Paralympic medalists in table tennis
Paralympic gold medalists for France
Paralympic silver medalists for France
Paralympic bronze medalists for France
Sportspeople from Bouches-du-Rhône
20th-century French women
21st-century French women